William Roscoe Reynolds (born May 21, 1942) is an American politician. A Democrat, he served in the Virginia House of Delegates 1986–97 and was elected to the Senate of Virginia in a December 1996 special election. Prior to his election to the House of Delegates, Reynolds served as Commonwealth's Attorney for Henry County, Virginia. He represented the 20th Senate district, made up of four counties and parts of two others in southwestern Virginia, plus the cities of Galax and Martinsville.

Elections
In 2007, Roscoe Reynolds defeated his opponent, Jeff Evans, 62.88% to 37.06%, winning re-election to the Senate of Virginia.
After redistricting changed the composition of the 20th Senate district, Reynolds was challenged by William Stanley, the incumbent from the 19th district. In a three-way race, Stanley defeated Reynolds by 644 votes, 46.80% to 45.54%.

Political positions

Castle Doctrine
Reynolds has voted multiple times against Castle Doctrine bills.
In January 2011, Reynolds voted against Senate Bill 876 (Castle Doctrine) which would have allowed "a lawful occupant use of physical force, including deadly force, against an intruder in his dwelling who has committed an overt act against him, without civil liability."
In February 2011, Reynolds was one of eight senators on the Senate Courts of Justice Committee who "passed by indefinitely" House Bill 1573, defeating the bill by an 8 to 4 margin.

Notes

References

External links

Project Vote Smart - Senator William Roscoe Reynolds (VA) profile
Follow the Money - Wm Roscoe Reynolds
2005 2003 2001 1999 campaign contributions
Washington Post - Senate District 20 Race

1942 births
21st-century American politicians
Methodists from Virginia
County and city Commonwealth's Attorneys in Virginia
Duke University alumni
Living people
Democratic Party members of the Virginia House of Delegates
People from Martinsville, Virginia
Virginia lawyers
Democratic Party Virginia state senators
Washington and Lee University School of Law alumni
People from Ridgeway, Virginia